The  is the largest wind farm in Japan. 
It has a total capacity of 95 MW, and is located in the Aoyama Plateau, Muroo-Akame-Aoyama Quasi-National Park.

The wind farm was built in stages. 
The first phase consisted of 20 750 kW turbines manufactured by JFE Engineering, commissioned in 2003.
These turbines have a rotor diameter of 50.5 m and a tower height of 50 m.
This original site covers 10.5 hectares and produced a maximum of 15 MW.
The second phase was commissioned between 2016 and 2017 and comprises an additional 40 larger 2 MW turbines with a rotor diameter of 65.4 m and a tower height of 80 m, manufactured by Hitachi.

See also 

Wind power in Japan

References 
NKK to Play Key Role in Wind Power Generation Project in Mie Prefecture

External links 
  

Wind farms in Japan